, better known mononymously as Tomoya, is a Japanese musician and drummer of the band One Ok Rock. Although not an original member, he has appeared on every One Ok Rock album.

Tomoya attended ESP Musical Academy where one of his lecturers who was in a band introduced him to a band they had played with earlier that was looking for a drummer. That band was One Ok Rock and after a period of playing as support, he formally joined a month before their major debut.  He often updates the One Ok Rock blog.

Personal life
Tomoya is the eldest member of ONE OK ROCK. In junior high school, he belonged to the percussion group in a brass band club, playing various percussion instruments such as tambourine and xylophone. He formed a band in the fall of his first year in high school, and started the band in earnest. After graduated from high school, he came to Tokyo and studied at a technical college.

On June 9, 2017 he announced that he had gotten married. He has three sons, born in November of 2017, May of 2019, and March of 2021.

Equipment 
Tomoya mainly plays drums as his instrument. He has also played percussion and xylophone.

See also 
 One Ok Rock discography

References

External links

  
 Official Tomoya Instagram

1987 births
Living people
Musicians from Hyōgo Prefecture
Japanese rock musicians
Japanese rock drummers
21st-century drummers
One Ok Rock members